The 2016–17 FC Ufa season was the 3rd successive season that the club will play in the Russian Premier League, the highest tier of association football in Russia, and 3rd in total. Ufa are also playing in the Russian Cup.

Season events
On 6 June 2016, Hancharenka was appointed as manager of FC Ufa. On 12 December 2016, Hancharenka left Ufa by mutual consent, with Sergei Semak being appointed as the club's new manager on 30 December 2016.

Squad

Youth team

Transfers

Summer

In:

Out:

Winter

In:

Out:

<ref>{{cite web|publisher=Gaziantepspor|url=http://www.gaziantepspor.org.tr/tr/haber-detay.asp?Sayfa=MARCIO%20DE%20SOUZA%20GREGORIO%20GAZ%DDANTEPSPOR%27DA&Id=5887|title=MARCIO DE SOUZA GREGORIO GAZİANTEPSPORDA|date=21 January 2017|language=Turkish}}</ref>

Competitions

Russian Premier League

Results by round

Matches

League table

Russian Cup

Squad statistics

Appearances and goals

|-
|colspan="14"|Players away from the club on loan:|-
|colspan="14"|Players who left Ufa during the season:''

|}

Goal scorers

Disciplinary record

References

External links
 Official Website

FC Ufa seasons
Ufa